Joseph Spencer Stewart (1863–1934) was the fourth president of the University of North Georgia.

References 

1863 births
1934 deaths
Presidents of the University of Georgia
Emory University alumni